Jiang'an may refer to the following locations in China:

Jiang'an County, Yibin, Sichuan
Jiang'an District, Wuhan, Hubei